St Salvator's Chapel is one of two collegiate chapels belonging to the University of St Andrews, the other being St Leonard's Chapel, situated in the grounds of the adjacent St Leonard's School. The chapel  was founded in 1450, by Bishop James Kennedy, built in the Late Gothic architectural style, and refurbished in the 1680s, 1860s and throughout the 20th century.  It is currently the chapel of the United college as well as being the major university chapel.

Students and members of the public regularly attend its numerous services, including morning prayers, weekly Evensong and, most popularly, Sunday services. The Sunday services are followed by the famous pier walk, in which students walk to the pier and back in academic procession. Other services are held occasionally to mark graduations and other such occasions, and the chapel also hosts wedding ceremonies for many of the university's alumni. The chapel has its own choir, The St Salvator's Chapel Choir, which sings at most services.

The name St Salvator is a reference to Jesus Christ and the former college for which the chapel was built founded by Bishop Kennedy. St Salvator's is the only University Chapel in Scotland to boast a full ring of six bells suitable for change ringing.  Four new bells were added to Catherine and Elizabeth (the existing bells) as part of the university's 600th anniversary celebrations in 2010, also marking the 550th anniversary of the chapel.

Burials
Alexander Burnet

References

University of St Andrews
1450 establishments in Scotland
Salvator's
Collegiate churches in Scotland
Category A listed buildings in Fife
Listed churches in Scotland
University and college chapels in the United Kingdom